Kolonia Chechelska  is a village in the administrative district of Gmina Policzna, within Zwoleń County, Masovian Voivodeship, in east-central Poland.

The village has a population of 20.

References

Kolonia Chechelska